Bridget Mary McConnell, Baroness McConnell of Glenscorrodale,  (born 28 May 1958) is a retired Scottish cultural administrator. Prior to retirement she served as the Chief Executive Officer of Glasgow Life, the charity responsible for delivering culture and sport in Glasgow. McConnell was instrumental in Glasgow’s successful bid for and subsequent hosting of the 2014 Commonwealth Games, serving as a member of the organising committee and as the Director of Ceremonies and Culture, while overseeing infrastructure required for the games. McConnell was responsible for a major overhaul of the city’s sports, leisure, arts and cultural facilities. McConnell is the wife of former First Minister of Scotland, Jack McConnell. In 2006, she was voted #15 in The Scotsman’s power 100 list.

Education and career 
McConnell was educated at Our Lady's High School, Cumbernauld, going on to graduate from St Andrews University (MA hons, 1982), Dundee College of Commerce (DIA 1983) and Stirling University (MEd, 1992; EdD, 2009). McConnell worked as the first curator of a local authority travelling art gallery with Fife County Council in 1983, then taking up the first ever jointly funded Local Authority/Scottish Arts Council Arts Officer post in Stirling District Council in 1984, followed by ten years in Fife Council firstly as Principal Arts Officer then Arts, Libraries, Museums and Recreation Manager. She joined Glasgow City Council in 1998 as Director of Cultural and Leisure Services.

As CEO, McConnell oversaw an annual budget of c.£108 million and leading a staff of 2,600 people working across nearly 100 culture and sport facilities, events and festivals. She served on numerous national committees and boards, including Unboxed2022, Carnegie Trust for the Universities of Scotland, and Arts and Business Scotland. McConnell was made a CBE in 2015 in recognition of Services to Culture.

Glasgow Life 
During the COVID pandemic, McConnell oversaw the redesign of the organisation, advocating for its role in the economic and social recovery of the city, as well as chairing the Health and Wellbeing group of the National Events Industry Advisory Group (Member) set up by the Scottish Government to give advice during the pandemic and in recovery planning.

Projects 
McConnell has overseen multiple major infrastructure projects, including the £35 million refurbishment of Kelvingrove Art Gallery and Museum (2006), an upgrade of the Mitchell Library, the £74 million Zaha Hadid designed Riverside Museum (2012), which was named European museum of the year 2013, the £113 million Emirates Arena and Sir Chris Hoy Velodrome (2012), £35 million phase 1 Kelvinhall development as a world class centre for heritage, learning, culture and sport (2015). The Burrell Collection, the c.£70 million project to refurbish and redisplay one of the world's finest single art collections, reopened in 2022.

Personal life 
While studying at University of St Andrews, McConnell met Procol Harum lead guitarist Richard Brown, and they had a daughter, Hannah, and a son, Mark, three years later. In 1987 McConnell filed for divorce from Brown, eventually marrying politician Jack McConnell who would become First Minister of Scotland in 2001.

References 

1958 births
Alumni of the University of St Andrews
Alumni of the University of Stirling
McConnell of Glenscorrodale
Commanders of the Order of the British Empire
Living people
Scottish chief executives
Spouses of life peers
Women chief executives